Microplana is a genus of land planarians found in Europe and Africa.

Description
Species of the genus Microplana are characterized by having an elongate, rounded body and generally only two eyes. The copulatory apparatus has a permanent conical penis with a muscular bulbus projecting into a short atrium. A genito-intestinal canal or a bursa copulatrix is usually present, connecting the intestine to the female atrium.

Ecology
Species of Microplana are adapted to different habitats. Most species occur in temperate forests, including beech, oak, pine and mixed forests, and seem to prefer neutral to basic soils, with pH values above 6. However, there are species adapted to drier habitats, such as the African savanna.

All Microplana species are carnivores, feeding on other invertebrates. Some are active predators, while others are mainly scavengers.

Species
The genus Microplana includes the following species:

Microplana aberana (Mell, 1904)
Microplana aixandrei Vila-Farré, Mateos, Sluys & Romero, 2008
Microplana astricta Sluys, Álvarez-Presas & Mateos, 2017
Microplana atropurpurea (von Graff, 1899)
Microplana attemsi (Bendl, 1909)
Microplana cephalofusca Sluys, Álvarez-Presas & Mateos, 2017
Microplana ceylonica (von Graff, 1899)
Microplana cherangani (de Beauchamp, 1936)
Microplana cingulata Álvarez-Presas, Sluys & Mateos, 2017
Microplana costaricensis (de Beauchamp, 1913)
Microplana edwardsi Jones & McDonald, 2021
Microplana fuscomaculosa Sluys, Mateos & Álvarez-Presas, 2017
Microplana gadesensis Vila-Farré, Mateos, Sluys & Romero, 2008
Microplana garavi Du Bois-Reymond Marcus, 1957
Microplana giustii Minelli, 1976
Microplana graffi (Geba, 1909)
Microplana grazalemica Vila-Farré, Mateos, Sluys & Romero, 2008
Microplana groga Jones, Webster, Littlewood & McDonald, 2008
Microplana haitiensis Prudhoe, 1949
Microplana harea Marcus, 1953
Microplana henrici (Bendl, 1908)
Microplana hovassei (de Beauchamp, 1934)
Microplana howesi (Scharff, 1900)
Microplana humicola Vejdovsky, 1889
Microplana hyalina Vila-Farré & Sluys, 2011
Microplana indica (Chaurasia, 1985)
Microplana kwiskea Jones, Webster, Littlewood & McDonald, 2008
Microplana lutulenta Álvarez-Presas, Sluys & Mateos, 2017
Microplana mediostriata (Geba, 1909)
Microplana montoyai (Fuhrmann, 1914)
Microplana nana Mateos, Giribet & Carranza, 1998
Microplana natalensis (Jameson, 1907)
Microplana nervosa Sluys, Mateos & Álvarez-Presas, 2017
Microplana neumanni (Mell, 1904)
Microplana peneckei (Meixner, 1921)
Microplana perereca Marcus & Du Bois-Reymond Marcus, 1959
Microplana plurioculata Sluys, Mateos & Álvarez-Presas, 2016
Microplana polyopsis Sluys, Álvarez-Presas & Mateos, 2016
Microplana purpurea (Bendl, 1908)
Microplana robusta Vila-Farré & Sluys, 2011
Microplana rufocephalata Hyman, 1954
Microplana scharffi (Graff, 1896)
Microplana shenzhensis Wang & Yu, 2013
Microplana sparsa Sluys, Mateos & Álvarez-Presas, 2017
Microplana termitophaga Jones, Darlington & Newson, 1990
Microplana terrestris (Müller, 1774)
Microplana thwaitesii (Moseley, 1875)
Microplana trifuscolineata (Kaburaki, 1920)
Microplana tristriata (Geba, 1909)
Microplana uniductus (de Beauchamp, 1930)
Microplana unilineata (Frieb, 1923)
Microplana viridis (Jameson, 1907)
Microplana voeltzkowi (von Graff, 1899)
Microplana yaravi du Bois-Reymond Marcus, 1957

References

Geoplanidae